The 1920–21 season was Manchester City F.C.'s thirtieth season of league football, and seventh consecutive season in the Football League First Division, excluding the four years during the First World War in which no competitive football was played.

Team Kit

Football League First Division

Results summary

Reports

FA Cup

Squad statistics

Squad
Appearances for competitive matches only

Scorers

All

See also
Manchester City F.C. seasons

References

External links
Extensive Manchester City statistics site

Manchester City F.C. seasons
Manchester City F.C.